Ryszard Jerzy Tarasiewicz (born 27 April 1962 in Wrocław) is a Polish football manager and former player.

Career

Club
After playing 10 years for Śląsk Wrocław, he left Poland in 1989 and played for Neuchâtel Xamax (Switzerland) and AS Nancy, RC Lens, Besançon RC (all in France).

National team
He played for the Polish national team and was a participant of the 1986 FIFA World Cup.

Managerial career

Just like his active career, Tarasiewicz started his managing career at Śląsk Wrocław. After 2 years, where he led the club to the II liga, he resigned due to conflicts with the club's then president Edward Ptak.

He went on to coach Jagiellonia Białystok, but was dismissed before the end of the season due to poor results.

On 19 June 2007 he yet again signed a contract with Śląsk Wrocław. In 2008, he led the club back to the highest Polish football league, the Ekstraklasa, making him the first manager in the club's history, who promoted twice with his team. On 22 September 2010 he was dismissed from his position due to a poor start to the 2010-11 Ekstraklasa season.

On 7 November 2011 he signed a contract with ŁKS Łódź.

Honours

Player
Śląsk Wrocław
Polish Cup: 1986–87

Manager
Zawisza Bydgoszcz
I liga: 2012–13
Polish Cup: 2013–14

References

External links
 
 

1962 births
Living people
Sportspeople from Wrocław
Polish footballers
Association football midfielders
Poland youth international footballers
Poland international footballers
1986 FIFA World Cup players
Śląsk Wrocław players
Neuchâtel Xamax FCS players
AS Nancy Lorraine players
RC Lens players
Racing Besançon players
Étoile Carouge FC players
Sarpsborg FK players
Ekstraklasa players
Ligue 1 players
Polish expatriate footballers
Expatriate footballers in France
Expatriate footballers in Switzerland
Polish football managers
Ekstraklasa managers
I liga managers
Śląsk Wrocław managers
Jagiellonia Białystok managers
ŁKS Łódź managers
Pogoń Szczecin managers
Zawisza Bydgoszcz managers
Korona Kielce managers
Arka Gdynia managers